Linda Hunt Williams (born August 12, 1948) is an American politician. She was elected to the North Carolina House of Representatives in 2016 and she served from 2017 until her resignation on August 31, 2018. A Republican, she represented the 37th district (based in southern Wake County).

Honors
In 2018, Williams was listed as a Champion of the Family in the NC Values Coalition Scorecard.

Committee assignments
Commerce and Job Development
Education - Community Colleges
Finance
Homeland Security, Military, and Veterans Affairs
Homelessness, Foster Care, and Dependency
State and Local Government II

Electoral history

References

Living people
Republican Party members of the North Carolina House of Representatives
1948 births
21st-century American politicians
Politicians from New Orleans
People from Holly Springs, North Carolina
Women state legislators in North Carolina
21st-century American women politicians